"The Old Marlborough Road" is a poem written by Trascendentalist philosopher Henry David Thoreau in 1850.

Thoreau lived near the disused Old Marlboro Road in Concord, Massachusetts, and frequently walked along it, which inspired him to write the poem. It first appeared as a journal entry in 1850; it was extensively revised before being incorporated into Walking, published posthumously in 1862.

References 

1850 poems
Works by Henry David Thoreau
American poems